Events in the year 1878 in India.

Incumbents
 Empress of India – Queen Victoria
 Viceroy of India – Robert Bulwer-Lytton, 1st Earl of Lytton

Events
National income - ₹3,960 million
 20 September – The Hindu, an Indian newspaper, was founded.

Law
Indian Treasure Trove Act
Sea Customs Act
Dentists Act (British statute)
Elders' Widows' Fund (India) Act (British statute)
Territorial Waters Jurisdiction Act (British statute)

Births
 21 February – The Mother (Mirra Alfassa), multi-origined spiritual leader and founder of Auroville in India (d. 1973)
27 November – Jatindramohan Bagchi, poet (d. 1948).
 10 December – C. Rajagopalachari, Indian politician and freedom-fighter. (d. 1972)

 
India
Years of the 19th century in India

Deaths
 15 June - Shiv Dayal Singh, Founder and first Satguru of Radha Soami faith (born 1818).